Samuel Leeper Jr. House, also known as the Leeper-Kline House, is a historic home located at South Bend, St. Joseph County, Indiana. It was built in 1888, and is a two-story, vernacular brick dwelling with rear additions. It has a gable roof and features a wraparound porch supported by nine round Doric order columns.

It was listed on the National Register of Historic Places in 1985.

References

Houses on the National Register of Historic Places in Indiana
Houses completed in 1888
Buildings and structures in South Bend, Indiana
Houses in St. Joseph County, Indiana
National Register of Historic Places in St. Joseph County, Indiana